Pedro Julio Sánchez (born 8 April 1940) is a retired Colombian road racing cyclist who won the 1968 Vuelta a Colombia. He also competed at the 1964 Summer Olympics and the 1968 Summer Olympics.

References

1940 births
Living people
Colombian male cyclists
Olympic cyclists of Colombia
Cyclists at the 1964 Summer Olympics
Cyclists at the 1968 Summer Olympics
People from Tolima Department
20th-century Colombian people